The 2006 Women's World Team Squash Championships is the women's edition of the 2006 World Team Squash Championships organized by the World Squash Federation, which serves as the world team championship for squash players. The event were held at the Royal Glenora Club in Edmonton, Alberta, Canada and took place from September 24 to September 30, 2006. The tournament was organized by the World Squash Federation and Squash Canada. The England team won his sixth World Team Championships beating the Egyptian team in the final.

Participating teams 
A total of 16 teams competed from all the five confederations: Africa, America, Asia, Europe and Oceania.

Seeds

Squads 

  England
 Tania Bailey
 Vicky Botwright
 Jenny Duncalf
 Alison Waters

  Hong Kong
 Rebecca Chiu
 Christina Mak
 Annie Au
 Joey Chan

  Ireland
 Aisling Blake
 Laura Mylotte
 Eleanor Lapthorne
 Madeline Perry

  Austria
 Pamela Pancis
 Birgit Coufal
 Ines Gradnitzer
 Konny Hofer

  Egypt
 Omneya Abdel Kawy
 Engy Kheirallah
 Raneem El Weleily
 Amnah El Trabolsy

  Canada
 Runa Reta
 Melanie Jans
 Carolyn Russell
 Alana Miller

  France
 Isabelle Stoehr
 Camille Serme
 Soraya Renai
 Célia Allamargot

  Spain
 Elisabet Sado
 Margaux Moros-Pitarch
 Laura Alonso
 Chantal Moros-Pitarch

  Malaysia
 Nicol David
 Sharon Wee
 Tricia Chuah
 Not Used

  New Zealand
 Shelley Kitchen
 Jaclyn Hawkes
 Louise Crome
 Joelle King

  United States
 Latasha Khan
 Meredeth Quick
 Louise Hall
 Ivy Pochoda

  Japan
 Nami Nishio
 Chinatsu Matsui
 Sachiko Shinta
 Kozue Onizawa

  Netherlands
 Vanessa Atkinson
 Annelize Naudé
 Margriet Huisman
 Orla Noom

  Australia
 Kasey Brown
 Melissa Martin
 Amelia Pittock
 Dianne Desira

  South Africa
 Tenille Swartz
 Claire Nitch
 Diana Argyle
 Janet van der Westhuizen

  Germany
 Katharina Witt
 Kathrin Rohrmüller
 Carola Weiss
 Daniela Schumann

Group stage results

Pool A

Pool B

Pool C

Pool D

Finals

Draw

Results

Quarter-finals

Semi-finals

Final

Post-tournament team ranking

See also 
 World Team Squash Championships

References

External links 
Women's World Team Squash Championships 2006 Official Website
Women's World Team Squash Championships 2006 SquashSite Website

World Squash Championships
Squash
W
Squash
Sport in Edmonton
2006 in women's squash
Squash tournaments in Canada